House of Salem is a 2016 horror-thriller film written and directed by James Crow. It stars Jessica Arterton, Jack Brett Anderson, Liam Kelly, Robert Daniel Lowe, Leslie Mills and Andrew-Lee Potts. The film premiered at the London FrightFest Film Festival on August 27, 2016.

Cast
 Jessica Anterton as Nancy
 Jack Brett Anderson as Jack
 Liam Kelly as Josh
 Leslie Mills as Jacob (as Les Mills)
 Robert Daniel Lowe as Mick
 Andrew-Lee Potts as Mr. Drowning
 Dean Maskell as Craig
 Anna Nightingale as Mrs. Drowning
 Tony Fadil as Lord Arthur Salem

Release
The film was premiered at the London FrightFest Film Festival on August 27, 2016 and released in the United States on January 23, 2018.

Reception
Brad Miska of Bloody Disgusting wrote: ‘House of Salem’ Murders in the Name of the Devil.

Matt Hudson of Horrornews.net wrote:

References

External links
 

2016 horror films
Films shot in England
Films shot in the United Kingdom
Films set in the United Kingdom
Films set in England
British horror films
American horror films
Films about witchcraft
Demons in film
2010s English-language films
Films directed by James Crow
2010s American films
2010s British films